Farhangsara Metro Station is the eastern end of Tehran Metro Line 2, in Iran. It was opened in 2010, with Mohammad-Bagher Ghalibaf attending the inauguration.  It is located in Jashnvareh Street in Tehranpars neighborhood. The next station is Tehran Pars Metro Station.

References

Tehran Metro stations
Railway stations opened in 2010